Harold Lewis Dibble (1951 – 10 June 2018) was an American Paleolithic archaeologist. His main research concerned the lithic reduction, during which he conducted fieldwork in France, Egypt, and Morocco. He was a professor of Anthropology at the University of Pennsylvania and Curator-in-Charge of the European Section of the University of Pennsylvania Museum of Archaeology and Anthropology.

Education
Dibble received his B.A. in 1971 and Ph.D. in 1981, both from the University of Arizona. He wrote his dissertation under the direction of Arthur J. Jelinek, an American archaeologist who had been trained in North American prehistoric archaeology by Leslie A. White and who worked on both the Paleolithic of Western Eurasia and the Mimbres culture in New Mexico. While a graduate student in the late 1970s, Dibble excavated with the French prehistorian François Bordes at the site of Pech de l'Azé IV in Carsac-Aillac, France, with whom he developed a strong mentoring relationship.

Archaeological work
The majority of Dibble's archaeological work has been centered around Neandertals and early modern humans in Western Eurasia, and more particularly on the stone tools which are thought to have been the primary mode of their material culture. He wrote his dissertation on the stone tool technology of Tabun Cave in Israel and then focused primarily on France, with other research on the Zagros stone tool industries until beginning work in Egypt and Morocco in 2001 and 2006 respectively. In addition to his excavation work, he has maintained a skeptical view of symbolism in the Middle Paleolithic, on which he has published several articles, and he has strongly advocated quantitative methods in archaeology. To that end, he pioneered the use of GIS and total stations in excavations and has worked to quantify the understanding of stone tool manufacture via reproductive experiments. As a graduate student, Dibble was paid to produce the stone tools used in the film Clan of the Cave Bear.

Scraper reduction
Dibble's most-cited contribution to archaeological thought is commonly known as scraper reduction, built off of ideas first developed by Jelinek and George Carr Frison. Dibble’s hypothesis is that as Middle Paleolithic scrapers are subject to retouching, their forms change in a predictable manner, and the many scraper types of the Bordian typology represent different stages in the continuum of reduction from fresh blank to exhausted transverse scraper. Moreover, the intensity of reduction, as measured by quantity of more reduced versus less reduced scrapers, strongly correlates to availability of raw material.

An analogy used by Dibble is that of a pencil. Its initial form is long, with a full eraser and blunt writing end, which is then sharpened and used repeatedly until discarded in a much shorter form with a worn eraser. This is the form in which the pencil would be found by someone digging through the trash, though it bears little resemblance to the initially produced form of the pencil. If pencils are more plentiful, then they may be more readily discarded earlier in their use life; if they are more scarce, then they will be resharpened far more and discarded in a far smaller state. This parallels the forms in which archaeologists find the used and discarded forms of Middle Paleolithic scrapers.

At the time of its proposition, this was a relatively radical idea, as prior to then it was generally assumed that the typological categories were both discrete and desired forms. This idea was the basis to an earlier feud, the Bordes-Binford Debate, between Bordes and Lewis R. Binford. While Bordes posited that various facies of the Mousterian, defined typologically, were the result of different cultures, Binford maintained that each of the facies was functionally defined. Dibble's theory, by implying that stone tools as discovered by archaeologists are the result of a constant process of use and reuse and that what is excavated is often at the end of a long and complicated use-life, forced a reexamination of the entire debate.

Fieldwork 
In 2011 he began directing excavations at La Ferassie, also in the Dordogne region, where 6 Neandertal skeletons were found in 1913 and one in 1972.

Additionally, he has directed or co-directed projects in France continuously since 1987, beginning at Combe-Capelle Bas in the  Valley, Dordogne, France from 1987 to 1990. This was followed by work with his former Ph.D. student Shannon J.P. McPherron at Cagny-l'Epinette, Somme, France from 1991 to 1994 and Fontéchevade, Charente-Maritime, France from 1994-1998. Just prior to excavating Roc de Marsal, Dibble and McPherron reexcavated Pech de l'Azé IV, where Dibble had worked with Bordes in the 1970s, from 1999 to 2002.

A major push of Dibble's research program has been to reexcavate known and previously excavated sites using modern methodology. This has been done in conjunction with reanalysis of the old lithic collections, and, when combined, these allow comparison between the old and new collections. The comparison illuminates what was kept and what was discarded by the previous excavators, giving new life and interpretive value to the older collections.

Computer applications in archaeology 

Dibble and McPherron have developed several freeware computer applications for Windows to facilitate archaeological fieldwork, including NewPlot (an archaeologically specific GIS program), EDM-CE and EDM Windows (data collector programs for use with Total Stations for Windows Mobile and Windows 95/98 respectively), and E4 (data collection program for artifact analysis). Their system has been adopted by a number of other excavators throughout North America, Europe and Africa, and they have published extensively on these methods.

Selected publications

Books 
Dibble, H. L. and A. Montet-White (editors). 1988. Upper Pleistocene Prehistory of Western Eurasia. University Museum, University of Pennsylvania, Philadelphia, PA. 
Dibble, H. L. and P. Mellars (editors). 1992. The Middle Paleolithic: Adaptation, Behavior, and Variability. University Museum, University of Pennsylvania, Philadelphia, PA. 
Olszewski, D. I. and H. L. Dibble (editors). 1993. The Paleolithic Prehistory of the Zagros-Taurus. University Museum, University of Pennsylvania, Philadelphia, PA. 
Debenath, A. and Dibble, H.L. 1994. Handbook of Paleolithic Typology: Lower and Middle Paleolithic of Europe. Philadelphia: University Museum Press. 
H. Dibble and O.Bar-Yosef (editors). 1995. The Definition and Interpretation of Levallois Technology.  Madison: Prehistory Press. 
Dibble, H. L. and M. Lenoir (editors). 1995. The Middle Paleolithic Site of Combe Capelle Bas (France). University Museum, University of Pennsylvania, Philadelphia, PA.
Dibble, H. and S. McPherron. 1996. Combe-Capelle on CD-ROM: A Multimedia Companion to The Middle Paleolithic Site of Combe-Capelle Bas (France). University Museum Press, University of Pennsylvania, Philadelphia, PA.
Dibble, H., S. McPherron, and B. Roth. 1999. Virtual Dig: A Simulated Archaeological Excavation of a Middle Paleolithic Site in France. Mayfield Press, Mountain View, Calif.
McPherron, S. and H.L. Dibble. 2002. Using Computers in Archaeology: A Practical Guide.  New York: McGraw-Hill Publishing. 
Dibble, H.L., D. Williamson, and B.M. Evans. 2003. The Human Evolution Cookbook. Philadelphia: University Museum Press. 
Dibble, H. L., S. P. McPherron and B. J. Roth. 2003. Virtual Dig: A Simulated Archaeological Excavation of a Middle Paleolithic Site in France. 2nd ed. Mayfield Publishing Company, Mountain View, CA.
Soressi, M. and H. L. Dibble (editors). 2003. Multiple Approaches to the Study of Bifacial Technologies. University Museum, University of Pennsylvania, Philadelphia, PA.
Chase, P., A. Debénath, H. Dibble, and S. McPherron. 2009. The Cave of Fontéchevade: Recent Excavations and Their Paleoanthropological Implications. Cambridge University Press, Cambridge.
El Hajraoui, M. A., R. Nespoulet, A. Debénath, and H. L. Dibble. Editors. 2012. Préhistoire de la Région de Rabat-Témara. Vol. III. VILLES ET SITES ARCHÉOLOGIQUES DU MAROC (V.E.S.A.M.). Rabat: Institut National des Sciences de l'Archéologie et du Patrimoine (INSAP).
Dibble, H. L., Shannon J. P. McPherron, Paul Goldberg, Dennis M. Sandgathe. 2018. The Middle Paleolithic Site of Pech de l'Azé IV. Springer.

Articles 

Dibble, H. L. 1983. "Variability and Change in the Middle Paleolithic of Western Europe and the Near East," in The Mousterian Legacy: Human Biocultural Change in the Upper Pleistocene, BAR International Series 164. Edited by E. Trinkaus, pp. 53–71. Oxford: British Archaeological Reports.

Dibble, H. L. 1987. Measurement of Artifact Provenience with an Electronic Theodolite. Journal of Field Archaeology 14(2):249-254.

Dibble, H. L. 1988. Typological Aspects of Reduction and Intensity of Utilization of Lithic Resources in the French Mousterian. In Upper Pleistocene Prehistory of Western Eurasia, edited by H. L. Dibble and A. Montet-White, pp. 181–187. University Museum Monograph 54. University Museum, University of Pennsylvania, Philadelphia, PA.
Dibble, H. L. 1988. The Interpretation of Middle Paleolithic Scraper Reduction Patterns. In La Technique, edited by L. R. Binford and J.-P. Rigaud, pp. 49–58. L'Homme de Néandertal. vol. 4, M. Otte, general editor. Etudes et Recherches Archéologiques de l'Université de Liège No. 31, Liège.

Dibble, H. L. and N. Rolland. 1992. On Assemblage Variability in the Middle Paleolithic of Western Europe: History, Perspectives, and a New Synthesis. In The Middle Paleolithic: Adaptation, Behavior, and Variability, edited by H. L. Dibble and P. Mellars, pp. 2–28. University Museum Monograph 78. University Museum, University of Pennsylvania, Philadelphia, PA.

Bar-Yosef, O. and H. L. Dibble. 1995. Preface. In The Definition and Interpretation of Levallois Technology, edited by H. L. Dibble and O. Bar-Yosef, pp. ix-xiii. Monographs in World Archaeology No. 23. Prehistory Press, Madison, WI.
Dibble, H. L. 1995. An Assessment of the Integrity of the Archaeological Assemblages. In The Middle Paleolithic Site of Combe-Capelle Bas (France), edited by H. L. Dibble and M. Lenoir, pp. 245–258. University Museum Monograph 91. University Museum, University of Pennsylvania, Philadelphia, PA.
Dibble, H. L. 1995. Biache-Saint-Vaast, Level IIA: A Comparison of Analytical Approaches. In The Definition and Interpretation of Levallois Technology, edited by H. L. Dibble and O. Bar-Yosef, pp. 93–116. Monographs in World Archaeology No. 23. Prehistory Press, Madison, WI.
Dibble, H. L. 1995. Raw Material Availability, Intensity of Utilization, and Middle Paleolithic Assemblage Variability. In The Middle Paleolithic Site of Combe-Capelle Bas (France), edited by H. L. Dibble and M. Lenoir, pp. 289–315. University Museum Monograph 91. University Museum, University of Pennsylvania, Philadelphia, PA.

McPherron, S. P. and H. L. Dibble. 1999. Stone Tool Analysis Using Digitized Images: Examples From the Lower and Middle Paleolithic. Lithic Technology 24(1):38-52.
McPherron, S. P. and H. L. Dibble. 2000. The Lithic Assemblages of Pech de l'Aze IV (Dordogne, France). Préhistoire Européenne 15:9-43.

Dibble, H.L., S.J.P. McPherron, P.G. Chase, W.R. Farrand, and A. Debénath. 2006. Taphonomy and the concept of Paleolithic cultures: The case of the Tayacian from Fontéchevade. PaleoAnthropology:1-21.

Dibble, H.L., P. Goldberg, S.J.P. McPherron, A. Turq, and D. Sandgathe. 2006. "Humans, climate and fire at the Mousterian site of Roc de Marsal, France," in Annual Meeting of the Geological Society of America. Philadelphia, PA: Geological Society of America.

Dibble, H.L. 1991. "Local Raw Material Exploitation and its Effects on Lower and Middle Paleolithic Assemblage Variability", in Raw Material Economies among Prehistoric Hunter-Gatherers, University of Kansas Publications in Anthropology. Edited by A. Montet-White and S. Holen, pp. 33–47. Lawrence, Kansas: University of Kansas.

References

External links
Faculty Profile - University of Pennsylvania Department of Anthropology
Old Stone Age - archaeological research group run by Dibble and McPherron
OSA software - freeware for archaeological excavations and analysis developed by Dibble and McPherron
Transcript - Nova's Neanderthals on Trial, in which Dibble is interviewed

1951 births
2018 deaths
Paleoanthropologists
American paleoanthropologists
American archaeologists
American anthropologists
University of Pennsylvania faculty